The Revolutionary Government of the Republic of Indonesia (PRRI) was a revolutionary government set up in Sumatra to oppose the central government of Indonesia in 1958.

Although frequently referred to as the PRRI/Permesta rebellion, the Permesta rebels were a separate movement in Sulawesi, that had pledged allegiance with the PRRI on 17 February 1958.

Background: Rebellion of the colonels
Prior to the establishment of the PRRI, there were several "rebellions" led by the various regional Army commanders in Sumatra. These events were the result of growing dissatisfaction with the Central Government and Indonesia's faltering economic development. The Central Government was seen by some in the outer islands (i.e. outside of Java) as disconnected from the Indonesian people. Some Army commands in the outer islands began covertly operating smuggling operations of copra and contraband items to improve their financial position. These operations were soon followed with requests for greater economic and political autonomy from the Central Government in Jakarta.  After their demands were not met they began to rebel against the government, conducting a series of bloodless coups within their regional command areas, and setting up alternative local government systems. The rebel army commands included:
Dewan Banteng (Banteng Council) in Central Sumatra which on 20 December 1956 under the leadership of Lieutenant Colonel Ahmad Husein (Commander of the 4th regiment of the Territorial Army in Sumatra) began to take over the local government of Central Sumatra.
Dewan Gajah (Elephant Council) in East Sumatra which on 22 December 1956 under Colonel Maludin Simbolon (Supreme Commander of the Territorial Army in Sumatra) began to take over the local government in East Sumatra and cut all relation with the Central Government.
Dewan Garuda (Garuda Council) in South Sumatra which on 15 January 1957 under Lieutenant Colonel Barlian took over the local government of South Sumatra.
Dewan Manguni (Manguni Council) in North Sulawesi which on 20 December 1956 under Lieutenant Colonel Ventje Sumual took over the local government of North Sulawesi.
Governor Roeslan, who yielded powers to Lieutenant Colonel Ahmad Husein, said that "The Banteng Council in particular and the people of Central Sumatra in general have no wish to build a State within a State, because relations between the Regional and the Central Government of the Republic of Indonesia will certainly return to normal when there is a Cabinet that can eliminate all the feelings of confusion, tension and dissatisfaction that threaten the security of the Indonesian State and People".

Ultimatum
The PRRI was proclaimed to have been established on 15 February 1958 by Lieutenant Colonel Ahmad Hussein  following the expiration of a five-day ultimatum to the government. The ultimatum demanded for three things. First, for the Djuanda Cabinet to return its mandate. Second, for Mohammad Hatta and the Sultan of Yogyakarta (Hamengkubuwono IX) to form a cabinet until a future election. Third, for President Sukarno to return to his constitutional position.

Following the declaration, a number of government officials sent to negotiate with the Banteng Council in Bukittinggi were detained, including Minister of Agriculture Eny Karim.

Members of the PRRI cabinet

The Revolutionary Government of the Republic of Indonesia formed a cabinet for the revolutionary government, with Sjafruddin Prawiranegara being named as both its prime minister and finance minister.

The composition was as follows:

Challenges
Despite the various stakeholders who had appeared to all be on the same side of resisting Central Government control to some extent, the declaration of the rebel government and the open split from the Central Government in Jakarta had immediately highlighted that not all parties were willing to take things to such an extreme. One of these unwilling parties was the Garuda Council led by Lieutenant Colonel Barlian. Even within Lieutenant Colonel Ahmad Hussein's Banteng Council, there were key leaders and segments who opposed the establishment of the PRRI. The lack of alienation from the political order of that time also meant that there was no real support or traction on the ground at all for such an open rebellion.

Giving no slack to the PRRI, the Central Government in Jakarta also moved decisively against the PRRI, arresting several of the named cabinet ministers, discharging from service military commanders who supported the PRRI and bombing key infrastructure in Sumatra.

Beginning of the end

The Central Government in Jakarta, having tolerated the dissident Army Councils for almost twelve months, promptly began preparations to militarily defeat the PRRI. The rebels had virtually no chance of success given the overwhelming superiority of the government forces. In addition, the military experience possessed by General Nasution, who was leading the government military forces, far exceeded that of Lieutenant Colonel Husein.

The government military campaign that commenced on 12 March 1958 scored a quick victory in preventing the destruction of the Caltex oil fields and refinery in Pekanbaru by the PRRI forces. That attack also laid bare that the PRRI was receiving military aid from the United States, given the large amount of US-made equipment abandoned by the PRRI forces which had taken flight.

The United States Government, especially the CIA (see CIA activities in Indonesia) had covertly supported the rebel PRRI Government in 1958, despite some dissent in the agency from Desmond Fitzgerald. With the Americans posturing to become directly involved in the crisis, General Nasution conducted surprise amphibious assaults on rebel cities in Sumatra during March 1958.

With the military balance swiftly swinging in favour of the Central Government in Jakarta during the period March–May 1958, and the fact that Lieutenant Colonel Husein had little choice but to pursue a strategy of withdrawal and guerrilla warfare which would make it difficult for the United States to publicly recognise the PRRI, the United States had to reconsider its previous policy assessment that the break-up of Indonesia and emergence of a Communist government was likely. The Pope incident on 18 May 1958 signalled the beginning of the end of the CIA's program of covert support to the PRRI, with the US shifting its support back towards Sukarno and the Central Government as the anticipated victor from the conflict.

Surrender
Although the conflict dragged on over the next three years, the government forces were successful in pushing the PRRI into the jungle and mountains, and retook several strongholds, including Kototinggi where the PRRI leadership was headquartered.

General Nasution, who was leading the government forces, launched Operasi Pemanggilan Kembali (Operation Call Back) at the end of 1960 to take advantage of internal rifts within the PRRI. The main objective of which was to persuade the army officers supporting the PRRI to surrender themselves, because once there was no longer military support, the civilians would also follow suit.

Small numbers of PRRI troops began surrendering from April 1961, while the majority did so in the middle of 1961. The last vestiges of the PRRI held out for a few more months before the final surrender by Mohammad Natsir, who was the last of them, on 28 September 1961.

Legacy

One of the most significant outcomes of the conflict was the establishment of Foreign Relations of the Soviet Union to the Indonesian Government. As the crisis had unfolded, the Indonesian Government had approached the American Government for arms to combat the rebel commands. The Americans, however, had declined the Indonesian request, forcing the Indonesians to approach the Soviet Union for assistance. The Soviet Union thus became a major supplier of arms to the Indonesian Government, allowing Indonesia to rapidly modernize its armed forces into one of the strongest in Southeast Asia. This had follow on effects in the West New Guinea dispute as Indonesia was able to escalate tensions in the dispute by threatening overt conflict.

Another important aspect was the influence of this event on the large exodus of Minangkabau people from Sumatra to other regions in Indonesia, along with the large psychological effects that stem from the attached stigma of being a rebel, despite the Minangkabau's determined resistance against the Dutch colonial system and the fact that many pre-Independence nationalistic leaders had hailed from Sumatra. In addition to the violence committed against the local community during and after the conflict period, the humiliation and trauma of the defeat had also rocked the self-esteem and dignity of the Minangkabau people. This was especially stark In an interview with Harun Zaid, where he said "What had an impact on me was the sadness in the eyes of the students. In 1961, the faces were dull as if they did not have any future".

References

Further reading

Liberal democracy period in Indonesia
Sukarno
Attempted coups in Indonesia
1958 in Indonesia
Provisional governments